Ostrowsko  is a village in Poland, in Lesser Poland Voivodeship, Nowy Targ County. In the years 1975-1998 it was in the Nowy Sącz Voivodeship. Ostrowsko is on the road from Nowy Targ to Czorsztyn and is located by the Dunajec River.

Ostrowsko